Punjab Council of Arts (PUCAR) is a provincial institute under the Information and Culture Department, Government of The Punjab, to promote arts, culture and literature in Punjab Province Pakistan.

Its executive director is Rizwan Sharif.

Headquarters and divisional councils
The headquarters of the Council is located at 53-Shadman-II Lahore.

In its first year, the Council acquired Rawalpindi and Lahore Arts Councils, previously known as Pakistan Arts Councils. The organization carries out its activities in accordance with PUCAR Regulations 1982.

A Board of Governors and Executive Committee are composed of literary, intellectual, and artistic personalities and public representatives.

The PUCAR Act of 1975 required establishment of divisional and district arts councils to promote art and culture and to provide facilities to artists and artisans to give them exposure and provide financial assistance, as well as giving them a platform and encouragement.

References

Organisations based in Lahore
Arts organisations based in Pakistan